Rainer Bock (born 31 July 1954) is a German actor and voice actor.

Early life and education
Bock was born in Kiel. After graduating from school, Bock ran a café in his hometown, where there was also a cabaret programme. After studying acting at a private drama school in Kiel, he made his debut in 1982 as a theatre actor on the stages of Kiel.

Career
He had already worked as a stage actor for about 25 years, beginning in 1982, in Kiel, at the National Theatre Mannheim, the Staatstheater Stuttgart, and at the Bavarian State Theatre in Munich, before his film work increased by the end of the 2000s. In 2011, four films he acted in were presented at the 61st Berlin International Film Festival.

Bock appeared in internationally known films directed by Steven Spielberg, Quentin Tarantino and Michael Haneke, and played minor roles in the TV shows Homeland, Better Call Saul, and SS-GB.

Filmography

Film

Television

Audiobooks 
 2006: Agatha Christie: Die Morde des Herrn ABC (Hercule Poirot), publisher: Der Hörverlag,

References

External links

 
Rainer Bock at the German Dubbing Card Index

1954 births
Living people
German male stage actors
German male film actors
Actors from Kiel
21st-century German male actors
20th-century German male actors